End-of-life planning may refer to:
 Estate planning
 Planning for end-of-life care
 End-of-life product planning